In linguistics, an object is any of several types of arguments. In subject-prominent, nominative-accusative languages such as English, a transitive verb typically distinguishes between its subject and any of its objects, which can include but are not limited to direct objects, indirect objects, and arguments of adpositions (prepositions or postpositions); the latter are more accurately termed oblique arguments, thus including other arguments not covered by core grammatical roles, such as those governed by case morphology (as in languages such as Latin) or relational nouns (as is typical for members of the Mesoamerican Linguistic Area).
In ergative-absolutive languages, for example most Australian Aboriginal languages, the term "subject" is ambiguous, and thus the term "agent" is often used instead to contrast with "object", such that basic word order is often spoken of in terms such as Agent-Object-Verb (AOV) instead of Subject-Object-Verb (SOV). Topic-prominent languages, such as Mandarin, focus their grammars less on the subject-object or agent-object dichotomies but rather on the pragmatic dichotomy of topic and comment.

Types

English
In English traditional grammar types, three types of object are acknowledged: direct objects, indirect objects, and objects of prepositions. These object types are illustrated in the following table:

Note that indirect objects are frequently expressed as objects of prepositions, complicating the traditional typology; e.g. "I gave salt to the man."

Other languages

Some Chinese verbs can have two direct objects, one being more closely bound to the verb than the other; these may be called "inner" and "outer" objects.

Secundative languages lack a distinction between direct and indirect objects, but rather distinguish primary and secondary objects. Many African languages fall into this typological category.

Syntactic category
While the typical object is a pronoun, noun, or noun phrase, objects can also appear as other syntactic categories, as illustrated in the following table for the English language:

{| class="wikitable"
|-
! Category !!  Example 
|-  
| Noun (phrase) or pronoun || The girl ate fruit.
|-
| that-clause || We remembered that we had to bring something. 
|-
| Bare clause || We remembered we had to bring something.
|-
| for-clause || We were waiting for him to explain.  
|-
| Interrogative clause || They asked what had happened. 
|-
| Free relative clause || I heard what you heard.
|-
| Gerund (phrase or clause) || He stopped asking questions. 
|-
| to-infinitive || Sam attempted to leave.
|-
| Cataphoric it || I believe it that she said that. 
|}

Identification
A number of criteria can be employed for identifying objects, e.g.:

1. Subject of passive sentence: Most objects in active sentences can become the subject in the corresponding passive sentences.

2. Position occupied: In languages with strict word order, the subject and the object tend to occupy set positions in unmarked declarative clauses.

3. Morphological case: In languages that have case systems, objects are marked by certain cases (accusative, dative, genitive, instrumental, etc.).

Languages vary significantly with respect to these criteria. The first criterion identifies objects reliably most of the time in English, e.g.

Fred gave me a book. 
a. A book was given (to) me.—Passive sentence identifies a book as an object in the starting sentence. 
b. I was given a book.—Passive sentence identifies me as an object in the starting sentence.

The second criterion is also a reliable criterion for analytic languages such as English, since the relatively strict word order of English usually positions the object after the verb(s) in declarative sentences. In the majority of languages with fixed word order, the subject precedes the object. However, the opposite is true for the very small proportion (approximately 2.9%) of the world's languages that utilize object–subject word order by default.

Verb classes
Verbs can be classified according to the number and/or type of objects that they do or do not take. The following table provides an overview of some of the various verb classes:

{| class="wikitable"
|-
! Transitive verbs !!  Number of objects !! Examples 
|-  
| Monotransitive || One object || I fed the dog.
|-
| Ditransitive || Two objects || You lent me a lawnmower.
|-
| Tritransitive || Three objects || I'll trade you this bicycle for your binoculars. 
|-
! Intransitive verbs !!  Semantic role of subject !! Examples 
|-
| Unaccusative || Patient || The man stumbled twice, The roof collapsed.
|-
| Unergative || Agent || He works in the morning, They lie often.
|}

Ergative and object-deletion verbs can be transitive or intransitive, as indicated in the following table:

{| class="wikitable"
|-
! Transitive !! Example
|-
| Ergative || The submarine sank the freighter.
|-
| Object deletion || We have already eaten dinner.
|-
! Intransitive !! Example
|-
| Ergative || The freighter sank.
|-
| Object deletion || We have already eaten. 
|}

The distinction drawn here between ergative and object-deletion verbs is based on the role of the subject. The object of a transitive ergative verb is the subject of the corresponding intransitive ergative verb. With object-deletion verbs, in contrast, the subject is consistent regardless of whether an object is or is not present.

In sentence structure
Objects are distinguished from subjects in the syntactic trees that represent sentence structure. The subject appears (as high or) higher in the syntactic structure than the object. The following trees of a dependency grammar illustrate the hierarchical positions of subjects and objects:

The subject is in blue, and the object in orange. The subject is consistently a dependent of the finite verb, whereas the object is a dependent of the lowest non-finite verb if such a verb is present.

See also

Subject (grammar)
Predicate (grammar)
Dependency grammar
Object pronoun
Prepositional pronoun
Transitive verb
Intransitive verb
Oblique case
Differential object marking
Subject–verb inversion in English
predication
predicand 
raising

Notes

Literature

Ágel, V., L. Eichinger, H.-W. Eroms, P. Hellwig, H. Heringer, and H. Lobin (eds.) 2003/6. Dependency and valency: An international handbook of contemporary research. Berlin: Walter de Gruyter.
Biber, D. et al. 1999. Longman Grammar of spoken and written English. Essex, England: Pearson Education limited. 
Carnie, A. 2013. Syntax: A generative introduction, 3rd edition. Malden, MA: Wiley-Blackwell.
Collins Cobuild English Grammar 1995. London: HarperCollins Publishers. 
Conner, J. 1968. A grammar of standard English. Boston: Houghton Mifflin Company.
Freeborn, D. 1995. A course book in English grammar: Standard English and the dialects, 2nd edition. London: MacMillan Press LTD.
Keenan, E. and B. Comrie 1977. Noun phrase accessibility and universal grammar. Linguistic Inquiry 8. 63–99.
Kesner Bland, S. Intermediate grammar: From form to meaning and use. New York: Oxford University Press.

External links
Direct Objects at chompchomp.com

Syntactic entities